Lorena Bedoya Durango (born 6 October 1997) is a Colombian footballer who plays as a midfielder for Atlético Nacional and the Colombia women's national team.

Club career
Bedoya started her career at América de Cali in 2017 before being transferred to Atlético Nacional the following year. In the 2019–20 season, she signed for Spanish Primera División club Deportivo La Coruña. Bedoya then returned to Colombia and returned to Atlético Nacional.

International career
Bedoya made her international debut in a friendly againtst Mexico on 21 September 2021. On 3 July 2022, she was called up by Nelson Abadía to represent Colombia at the 2022 Copa América Femenina.

Honours
Colombia
Copa América Femenina runner-up: 2022

Notes

References

External links

1997 births
Living people
Sportspeople from Antioquia Department
Colombian women's footballers
Women's association football midfielders
Colombia women's international footballers
Colombian expatriate women's footballers
Colombian expatriate sportspeople in Spain
América de Cali (women) players
Atlético Nacional (women) players
Deportivo de La Coruña (women) players
21st-century Colombian women